The Massachusetts Pirates are a professional indoor football team of the Indoor Football League based in Worcester, Massachusetts, with home games at the DCU Center. The Pirates began play in the 2018 season as a member of the National Arena League (NAL).

The Pirates are the third indoor/arena team to call Worcester home, following the Massachusetts Marauders of the Arena Football League (1994) and the New England Surge of the Continental Indoor Football League (2007–2008)

History
After numerous speculation beforehand, the Pirates were officially announced as members of the NAL on November 15, 2017. The team began play in the 2018 season. The Pirates won their inaugural game, played at the DCU Center on April 7, defeating the Maine Mammoths 51–24. They were led most of the season by quarterback Sean Brackett until the second-to-last regular season game where he was injured for the remainder of the season in a 46–35 loss to the Jacksonville Sharks, who then took over the top seed in the NAL. Darron Thomas started the following week in 67–7 win over the win-less Lehigh Valley Steelhawks; following a Sharks loss to the Mammoths the Pirates secured the top seed and a home game in the 2018 playoffs. The team finished their inaugural season with a regular season record of 11–5 but lost the semifinal playoff game to the Columbus Lions 50–36. After the season, inaugural head coach Ameer Ismail was hired as the head coach of the San Diego Strike Force expansion team in the Indoor Football League, but then joined the NAL's Carolina Cobras instead.

For the 2019 season, offensive coordinator Anthony Payton was named the head coach. The team finished in third place with an 8–6 record and qualified for the playoffs. They lost the semifinal game to the Carolina Cobras 30–26.

Following the 2019 season, the NAL announced it was creating a new league via a merger with Champions Indoor Football. The Pirates announced it did not agree with the merger and withdrew from the league. Head coach Payton then left to become head coach of the Carolina Cobras and was replaced by Patrick Pass. Two weeks after the announced merger, it was dissolved and the Pirates rejoined the NAL. The 2020 season was then cancelled due to the COVID-19 pandemic making arenas unavailable. The team was removed from the NAL when it was not offered an extension on its initial three-year membership agreement while the team was openly looking to join other leagues.

On August 19, 2020, the Pirates announced that they were joining the Indoor Football League for the 2021 season as its first East Coast-based team and had signed a three-year lease extension with the DCU Center. The Pirates finished in second place following the regular season and defeated the regular season champion, the Arizona Rattlers, in the United Bowl to win their first league championship.

In 2022, head coach Pass transitioned to become the director of football personnel development for the Pirates and defensive coordinator Rayshaun Kizer was promoted to head coach. The Pirates finished the season with a record of 11-5 in the regular season and fell to the Quad City Steamwheelers in the first round of the IFL playoffs in OT 39-38. Four players were selected to the All-IFL team at the end of the season. Defensive back Aarion Maxey-Penton and wide receiver Thomas Owens received First All-IFL team honors while defensive lineman Da'Sean Downey and offensive lineman Roubbens Joseph received Second All-IFL team honors.

Personnel

Current roster

Management
 Hassan Yatim – Owner
 Jawad Yatim – Owner and president

Statistics

Season-by-season results

Head coaches
Note: Statistics are correct as of the 2022 Indoor Football League season.

References

External links
 Massachusetts Pirates official site

 
2017 establishments in Massachusetts
American football teams established in 2017
American football teams in Massachusetts
Defunct National Arena League teams
Indoor Football League teams
Sports teams in Worcester, Massachusetts